Corrales is a village in Sandoval County, New Mexico, United States. First farmed by Tiquex Pueblo people, chosen due to its proximity to the Rio Grande, as documented by Hispano farmers of Nuevo México in the late 1500s. Despite being a part of the Albuquerque metropolitan area, the village maintains its rural character, while also being surrounded by the cities of Albuquerque and Rio Rancho. The population of Corrales was 8,329 at the 2010 Census.

The Rio Grande Bosque on the eastern edge of the village provides refuge for native animals and plants, and ancient Pueblo and Hispano acequias continue to be maintained by the United States Department of Agriculture's Natural Resources Conservation Service and the Middle Rio Grande Conservancy District.

History

The village of Corrales (Spanish for "corrals") is located along the Rio Grande river and is built on the site of two Indian Pueblos settled before AD 500 by the Tiguex Indians, and which were later occupied by Spanish Colonists and explorers who colonized the region around 1540. The Spanish Colonists subsequently built an adobe church on the site called the Church of San Ysidro in 1868, named after the annual fiesta de San Ysidro in May.

In 1710, a grant of the Alameda lands (including Corrales) was given to Corporal Francisco Montes Vigil, A soldier in the Spanish army. Vigil sold it in 1712 to Captain Juan Gonzáles Bas who was then living in Bernalillo. Gonzáles subsequently sold the land comprising the Village of Corrales in 1718 to Salvador Martinez.  Over time, the land comprising the Village of Corrales was parceled off and sold for agricultural development and livestock ranching.  The current Village of Corrales government was incorporated and chartered in 1971.

The village was selected as #19 in CNN Money's list of the 100 best places to live in 2007.

Geography
Corrales is located at  (35.234838, −106.618183).

Until 2005, portions of the Village of Corrales were located in both Bernalillo and Sandoval counties. In 2005, a special election annexed the portion of Corrales located in Bernalillo County to Sandoval County, so that now the entire village is located in Sandoval County.

Climate

Demographics

Corrales is part of the Albuquerque Metropolitan Statistical Area.

Corrales has a rapidly growing Asian population, holding up to 3-4% as of 2022.

As of the census of 2000, there were 7,334 people, 2,819 households, and 2,122 families residing in the village. The racial makeup of the village was 86.05% White, 0.57% African American, 1.51% Native American, 0.79% Asian, 0.03% Pacific Islander, 8.22% from other races, and 2.82% from two or more races. Hispanic or Latino of any race were 25.55% of the population.

There were 2,819 households, out of which 32.5% had children under the age of 18 living with them, 65.4% were married couples living together, 7.1% had a female householder with no husband present, and 24.7% were non-families. 18.1% of all households were made up of individuals, and 4.7% had someone living alone who was 65 years of age or older. The average household size was 2.60 and the average family size was 2.97.

In the village, the population was spread out, with 24.6% under the age of 18, 4.8% from 18 to 24, 25.9% from 25 to 44, 34.2% from 45 to 64, and 10.5% who were 65 years of age or older. The median age was 42 years. For every 100 females, there were 93.5 males. For every 100 females age 18 and over, there were 90.2 males.

The median income for a household in the village was $67,217, and the median income for a family was $79,331. Males had a median income of $52,397 versus $34,091 for females. The per capita income for the village was $33,629. About 3.1% of families and 5.0% of the population were below the poverty line, including 7.8% of those under age 18 and 1.8% of those age 65 or over.

Village infrastructure 
Unlike the surrounding communities of Rio Rancho and Albuquerque, the Village of Corrales does not have a centralized water system for running water or a municipal sewage system, which requires homes and businesses to each install their own wells and water pumping systems and leach fields for sewage disposal. Newer homes built in Corrales are no longer allowed to install leach fields and are required to use closed septic systems with a holding tank which must be pumped regularly by sewage trucks at the homeowner's expense. The Village has an extensive system of canals which transport water from the Rio Grande river to crop fields and pasturage for crop irrigation and livestock.

Biology 
The Village is heavily wooded with large stands of cottonwood and other native trees. Russian olive trees grow throughout the area and are an invasive species. Corrales is divided in a lower riparian habitat and a drier, sandy shrubland uphill on the west side of the Rio Grande river.

There is a wide variety of animals that use Corrales and the surrounding ecosystems. The most popular with visitors is fish for fishing activities, and birds for wildlife viewing.

Education
It is within Albuquerque Public Schools. Corrales Elementary School is in Corrales.

There is a PK-8 Christian private school, Sandia View Christian School. It is affiliated with the Corrales Seventh-day Adventist Church.

Corrales has its own public library, Corrales Community Library.

Notable people

 Fred Harris, retired United States Senator from Oklahoma
 Timothy Kraft, political consultant and campaign manager
 Brenda McKenna, member of the New Mexico Senate
 Jace Norman, actor
 Stephen R. Donaldson, fantasy writer

References

External links
Official Instagram Page for the Village of Corrales
Official Facebook Page for the Village of Corrales
Village of Corrales Website
Village of Corrales Forms & Permits

Villages in Sandoval County, New Mexico
Villages in New Mexico
Albuquerque metropolitan area